J. Frank Glendon (October 25, 1886 – March 17, 1937) was an American film actor. He appeared in more than 70 films between 1915 and 1936. He was born in Choteau, Montana, and died in Hollywood, California.

Selected filmography

 Cannibal King (1915)
 The Light in Darkness (1917) 
 Wrath of Love (1917) 
 A Night in New Arabia (1917) 
 The Dawn of Understanding (1918) 
 The Woman in the Web (1918)
 The Changing Woman (1918)
 The Enchanted Barn (1919)
 The Wishing Ring Man (1919)
 Roman Candles (1920)
 Mid-Channel (1920)
 For the Soul of Rafael (1920) 
 The Forgotten Woman (1921)
 What Do Men Want? (1921)
 Hush (1921)
 A Tale of Two Worlds (1921)
 Belle of Alaska (1922)
 More to Be Pitied Than Scorned (1922)
 Night Life in Hollywood (1922)
 Kissed (1922)
 Just Like a Woman (1923)
 South Sea Love (1923)
 Private Affairs (1925)
 Tricks (1925)
 Lights of Old Broadway (1925)
 Border Romance (1929)
 The Cheyenne Cyclone (1931)
 The Texas Tornado (1932)
 Law and Lawless (1932)
 The Reckless Rider (1932)
 The Lost Special (1932)
 Notorious but Nice (1933)
 Gun Law (1933)
 Strange People (1933)
 The Phantom Empire (1935)
 The Fighting Marines (1935)
 The Call of the Savage (1935)
 King of the Pecos (1936)
 The Lion's Den (1936)
 The Traitor (1936)

References

External links

1886 births
1937 deaths
American male film actors
American male silent film actors
Male actors from Montana
People from Choteau, Montana
20th-century American male actors
Burials at Forest Lawn Memorial Park (Glendale)